Tsouzi (Greek: Τσούζει; English: It burns) is the seventh studio album by Greek singer-songwriter and record producer Nikos Karvelas, released by CBS Records Greece in April 1989. In 1997, a remastered version of the album was released, with the same track list as on the initial 1989 CD version.

Track listing 

† Included on the CD issue of the album as bonus tracks. Same track list on the 1997 remastered version.

External links 
 Official site

1989 albums
Albums produced by Nikos Karvelas
Greek-language albums
Nikos Karvelas albums
Sony Music Greece albums